Anne Sharpley (1928-1989) was an English journalist.

In the 1940s, she attended art school in York. While there, she won a Vogue magazine competition, which led to a career in journalism. During the 1960s, she was an investigative reporter with London's Evening Standard.

She was known for scooping other reporters with her account of Winston Churchill's funeral, by vandalising a telephone after filing it, thereby delaying her rivals' reports. She reputedly told Ann Leslie that a female foreign correspondent should:

She appeared as a castaway on the BBC Radio programme Desert Island Discs on 2 January 1967.

Six photographs of her, five in a 1961 series by Ida Kar and one from 1965, by Jorge Lewinski, are in the collection of the National Portrait Gallery. A memorial to her, in the form of a planted urn on a stone plinth, stands in St John's Lodge Garden, Regent's Park, London. The plinth is inscribed with the words:

William Stevenson described how she was nicknamed "Shapley Sharpley" by Randolph Churchill.

References 

1928 births
Place of birth missing
1989 deaths
Place of death missing
London Evening Standard people
Journalists from Yorkshire
People from York
British investigative journalists